"My Heart Is Yours" is a worship song released by Passion as the lead single from their 2014 live album, Passion: Take It All, on April 1, 2014. It features live vocals from American Christian music singer and worship leader Kristian Stanfill. The song peaked at No. 13 on the Christian Songs Billboard chart and appeared on the 2012 year-end Christian Songs chart at No. 27. The song's bridge features lines from the popular hymn "I Surrender All" by Judson W. Van DeVenter and Winfield Scott. This song was also listed at No. 12 on Worship Leader's Top 20 Songs of 2014.

Track listing 

 Digital download

 "My Heart Is Yours (feat. Kristian Stanfill)" – 7:07

 Digital download (radio version)

 "My Heart Is Yours (feat. Kristian Stanfill) [Radio Version]" – 4:08

Charts

Weekly charts

Year-end charts

References 

2014 songs
Passion Conferences songs
Songs written by Jason Ingram
Songs written by Winfield Scott (songwriter)